The Rovno offensive — the operation of the Austro-Hungarian Northern armies against the armies of the Russian Southwestern Front — the so-called "campaign on Rovno", or Lutsk-Rovno offensive operation. The purpose of the offensive was the liberation of Eastern Galicia, but by the end of the operation, a small part of Eastern Galicia was still held by the Russian Imperial Army.

Background 

At the end of August 1915, the Austro-Hungarian command plans a major offensive on Rovno by the forces of the 1st and 4th armies. At the same time, the 2nd, 7th and Southern armies were to finally oust the Russian troops from the borders of Austria-Hungary and, if possible, occupy Podolia. The idea of the operation on August 14 was outlined by the Chief of the General Staff of Austria-Hungary, Infantry General Franz Conrad von Hötzendorf to his German colleague, Infantry General Erich von Falkenhayn. Success was supposed to bring a breakthrough at the junction of the 3rd Army of the NorthWestern Front and the 8th Army of the SouthWestern Front and coverage of the left flank of the 8th Army with access to Rovno. The Russian 11th Army was dealt a frontal attack by the 2nd and Southern armies. The Austro-Hungarian 7th Army, if possible, drove the Russian 9th Army from the Dniester River and occupied the city of Kamianets-Podilskyi. The Central Powers managed to concentrate numerically superior forces, especially on the right flank of the 8th Russian Army. At the same time, the entire Austro-Hungarian 4th Army was in reserve for the development of success. But the command of the armies of the Russian Southwestern Front, using the stable position of the 9th Army, concentrated the reserve in two army corps to fend off a possible breakthrough and cover the 8th Army.

Battle
After the occupation of Kovel by the 1st Austro-Hungarian army on August 25, Archduke Josef Ferdinand deployed the 14th corps around the right flank of the Russian 8th army, sent the 9th and 10th corps along the Lutsk highway. A significant superiority in manpower was countered by marshy terrain cut by rivers and destroyed roads in the rear. Only the highway from Rava-Ruska and Lvov (Lemberg) worked.

On August 26-27, the Austro-Hungarian 1st Army reached the Stokhid River. The 5th Corps of the 2nd Army attacked the 6th Army Corps of the Russian 11th Army and crossed the Zolota Lypa River. The commander-in-chief of the armies of the Southwestern Front, Nikolai Ivanov, to parry the detour, handed over to Aleksei Brusilov his reserve - the 39th Army Corps with the task of inflicting a counter strike on the Austro-Hungarians northwest of Lutsk. To reduce the front, it was ordered on the night of August 8 to begin the withdrawal of the troops of the 8th and 11th armies.

On August 28-30, the Austro-Hungarian troops continued their offensive and crossed the Styr River in several places. The 14th Corps bypassed Lutsk from the east, the counterattacks of the Russian 39th Army Corps were repelled. Ivanov allowed Brusilov to begin a gradual withdrawal of the 8th Army and asked the neighboring 3rd Army not to withdraw and to support the right flank of the front with cavalry. The dispatch of the 30th Army Corps to the Northwestern Front was canceled; it was also sent to the 8th Army. These maneuvers were facilitated by the presence of a railway in the rear.

But on August 31, the Austro-Hungarian 14th Corps struck a new blow and captured Lutsk. The 8th Army retreated across the Styr River. The reason for the failure was that in the midst of the attack, the 39th Army Corps ran out of cartridges for the Japanese rifles with which it was armed. On the site of the 11th Army, a blow was struck at Zolochiv, but here the fighting took on a stubborn character; a counterattack by the Russian 22nd and 18th Army Corps managed to return some of the positions and capture 4,689 prisoners from the Southern Army, which was driven back across the Studzyanka River.

On August 31, von Hötzendorf brought to the army commanders the goal of further actions: not only to clear Eastern Galicia from Russian troops, but also to deliver a decisive blow, for which the 2nd Army, avoiding protracted battles, bypass the Ikva River from the south through Kremenets, 1- The 1st Army will also capture Dubno bypass, the 4th Army will capture Rovno as soon as possible, where Russian reinforcements are arriving. After regrouping, the Austro-Hungarian troops continued their offensive, which on September 3-4 ran into stubborn resistance from the Russian 8th and 11th armies.

Outcome 

The Rovno offensive did not lead to the achievement of the goal set by the Austro-Hungarian Army High Command. A small part of Eastern Galicia was still occupied by Russian troops, The Dual Monarchy managed to capture Lutsk and part of Volhynia and Polesia, but the Russian troops turned the tide of the operation, inflicted a strong counterattack on the Austro-Hungarians and heavy losses. Russian troops, not having superiority in strength in this operation, at the same time captured a large number of prisoners - 1,294 officers and 71,625 soldiers, 212 machine guns, 37 guns. It was possible to keep Lutsk and the line of the  Styr and Kormin Rivers only with the help of German troops. The result of stubborn and bloody battles in the autumn of 1915 in Galicia and Volhynia, as well as in Belarus and the Baltic states, was the transition of the forces of the Central Powers to strategic defense.

References

Battles
World War I
1915 in Europe
Russian Empire
Battles of World War I involving Russia
World War I
Military operations of World War I involving Austria-Hungary